Nuray "Nur" Yerlitaş (11 August 1955 – 27 April 2020) was a Turkish fashion designer.

Life 
Nur Yerlitaş was born on 11 August 1955 in the Vefa, Istanbul. She was of Arab descent from her mother's side, and of Turkish descent from her father's side. She started her career by selling accessories from Italy. In the following years she opened her own boutique and entered into designing business.

In August 2018, Yerlitaş was diagnosed with brain cancer, for which she underwent surgery. She had a second surgery in March 2019. She died on 27 April 2020 at her home in Istanbul. Her funeral was held at Zincirlikuyu Mosque and her body was buried at Ulus Cemetery.

Filmography 
Television
 Bak Kim Dans Ediyor (2007)
 Yemekteyiz (2010)
 Bugün Ne Giysem (2011)
 Bu Tarz Benim (2014)
 İşte Benim Stilim (2015–2017)
 Maral: En Güzel Hikâyem (2015) – episode 9

Music videos
 "Türkan" – Demet Akalın (2011)
 "Karagözlüm" – Serkan Kaya (2019)

Commercials
 Yedigün (2015)

References

External links 

1955 births
2020 deaths
Turkish people of Arab descent
Turkish fashion designers
Turkish women fashion designers
Deaths from brain cancer in Turkey
Burials at Ulus Cemetery